Events from the year 1792 in Great Britain.

Incumbents
 Monarch – George III
 Prime Minister – William Pitt the Younger (Tory)
 Foreign Secretary – Lord Grenville
 Parliament – 17th

Events
 January – the investment management business which will become the Charles Stanley Group in London is established as a banking partnership in Sheffield.
 25 January – the radical London Corresponding Society is established.
 7 March – a settlement is formed in Sierra Leone in West Africa as a home for freed slaves.
 23 March – Joseph Haydn premieres his Symphony No. 94 (the "Surprise"), the second of his twelve London symphonies, at the Hanover Square Rooms.
 4 June – Captain George Vancouver claims Puget Sound for Britain.
 21 June – Iolo Morganwg holds the first Gorsedd ceremony, at Primrose Hill in London.
 September – Macartney Embassy: George Macartney, 1st Earl Macartney, sails from Portsmouth in HMS Lion as the first official envoy from the Kingdom of Great Britain to China.
 14 September – radical Thomas Paine flees to France after being indicted for treason.
 29 September – first St Patrick's Church, Soho Square, London (Roman Catholic) consecrated as a chapel.
 2 October – Baptist Missionary Society is founded in Kettering.
 18 December – the trial of Thomas Paine in absentia for treason begins. He is outlawed.

Undated
 Over 300 petitions are presented to Parliament against the slave trade. The House of Commons pledges to abolish the trade "gradually".
 "Year of the Sheep" in the Scottish Highlands: mass emigration of crofters following Clearances for grazing.
 Fox's Libel Act restores to juries the right to determine what constitutes libel; it remains in force until abolition of criminal libel in 2010.
 Henry Walton Smith and his wife Anna establish the newsagent's business in Little Grosvenor Street, London, which will become W H Smith.

Publications
 Thomas Holcroft's Anna St. Ives, the first British Jacobin novel.
 Thomas Paine's second edition of Rights of Man, urging the overthrow of the British monarchy.
 Mary Wollstonecraft's A Vindication of the Rights of Woman, one of the earliest works of feminist literature.

Births
 10 February – Frederick Marryat, author (died 1848)
 19 February – Roderick Murchison, geologist (died 1871)
 7 March – John Herschel, mathematician and astronomer (died 1871)
 12 April – John Lambton, 1st Earl of Durham (died 1840) 
 25 April – John Keble, churchman and poet (died 1866)
 17 May – Anne Isabella Milbanke, wife of George Gordon Byron, 6th Baron Byron (died 1860)
 16 June – John Linnell, painter (died 1882)
 7 July – William Henry Smith, businessman (died 1865)
 4 August – Percy Bysshe Shelley, poet (died 1822)
 13 August – Adelaide of Saxe-Meiningen, queen of William IV (died 1849)
 18 August – John Russell, 1st Earl Russell, Prime Minister (died 1878)
 11 November – Mary Anne Disraeli, wife of Benjamin Disraeli (died 1872)

Deaths
 27 January – George Horne, bishop (born 1730)
 8 February – Hannah Snell, soldier (born 1723)
 23 February – Sir Joshua Reynolds, painter (born 1723)
 3 March – Robert Adam, architect (born 1728)
 10 March – John Stuart, 3rd Earl of Bute, Prime Minister (born 1713)
 3 April – George Pocock, admiral (born 1706)
 30 April – John Montagu, 4th Earl of Sandwich, statesman, First Lord of the Admiralty and rake (born 1718)
 24 May – George Brydges Rodney, 1st Baron Rodney, naval officer (born 1719)
 4 June – John Burgoyne, general (born 1723)
 18 July – John Paul Jones, sailor and the United States's first well-known naval fighter in the American Revolution (born 1747)
 3 August – Richard Arkwright, inventor (born 1732)
 5 August – Frederick North, Lord North, Prime Minister (born 1732)
 28 October – John Smeaton, civil engineer (born 1724)

References

 
Years in Great Britain